Éric Le Chanony (born February 28, 1968) is a French former bobsledder who competed during the 1990s. He won a bronze medal in the four-man event (tied with Great Britain) at Nagano in 1998.

Le Chanony also won two medals at the FIBT World Championships with one gold (Four-man: 1999) and one bronze (Two-man: 1995).

References
 Bobsleigh four-man Olympic medalists for 1924, 1932-56, and since 1964
 Bobsleigh two-man world championship medalists since 1931
 Bobsleigh four-man world championship medalists since 1930
 DatabaseOlympics.com profile

1968 births
Bobsledders at the 1994 Winter Olympics
Bobsledders at the 1998 Winter Olympics
Bobsledders at the 2002 Winter Olympics
French male bobsledders
Olympic bobsledders of France
Olympic bronze medalists for France
Living people
Olympic medalists in bobsleigh
Medalists at the 1998 Winter Olympics